This is a list of senators from the state of Victoria since Australian Federation in 1901.

List

Senators, Victoria
Senators